Group Captain Gilbert Stuart Martin Insall, VC, MC (14 May 1894 – 17 February 1972) was a British aviator and recipient of the Victoria Cross, the highest award for gallantry in the face of the enemy that can be awarded to British and Commonwealth subjects.

First World War
Insall was commissioned as a second lieutenant (on probation) in the Royal Flying Corps on 14 March 1915, during the First World War. He was appointed a Flying Officer in the RFC on 16 July, and was confirmed in his rank from the same date.

Insall was 21 years old, and a second lieutenant in the 11 Squadron, Royal Flying Corps when he won the Victoria Cross (VC).

On 7 November 1915 near Achiet-le-Grand, France, Second Lieutenant Insall, on patrol in Vickers F.B.5 Gunbus No. 5074 with 1st Class Air Mechanic T. H. Donald, engaged an Aviatik two-seater and forced the German pilot to make a rough landing in a ploughed field. Seeing the air crew scramble out and prepare to fire, Insall dived to 500 ft and his gunner opened fire, whereupon the Germans fled. After dropping an incendiary bomb on the downed German aircraft, Insall flew through heavy fire at 2000 ft over enemy trenches. The Vickers' petrol tank was hit, but Insall brought the plane 500 yards back inside Allied lines for an emergency landing.  Insall and Donald stayed by the Gunbus through a bombardment of about 150 shells while awaiting nightfall. After dark, they then set to work by torch light to salvage their plane. After they repaired the machine overnight, Insall flew them back to base at dawn.

The announcement and accompanying citation for Insall's VC was published in a supplement to the London Gazette on 23 December 1915, reading:

Insall could not personally receive his VC in 1915, however; he and Donald had fallen wounded into captivity on 14 December 1915 after engaging Hauptmann Martin Zander and his gunner. While in captivity, he was promoted to lieutenant, on 1 April 1916. Insall escaped on his third try, on 28 August 1917, and made it home over the Dutch border on 6 September. His VC was presented by the King on 27 September 1917. He returned to duty as the Flight Commander of "A" Flight, 50 Squadron, with the temporary rank of captain, on 11 January 1918.

Royal Air Force career

After the war, Insall remained in the service, receiving a permanent commission as a captain in the newly formed Royal Air Force on 1 August 1919; his rank was regraded to flight lieutenant from the same date. He was promoted to squadron leader on 1 November. On 16 December, he was awarded the Military Cross (MC) for gallantry in escaping from captivity as a POW during the war.

On a clear day in 1925, he spotted a strange formation of pits in the ground below him. He took a photograph, and from this one photograph came the rediscovery of the Bronze Age site now known as Woodhenge two miles from Stonehenge (Crawford, Air-Photography for Archaeologists 1929). In 1929 he similarly discovered Arminghall Henge.

Insall served in Southern Mesopotamia (Iraq) against the Akhwan in 1927–1928, for which he was mentioned in dispatches and awarded the General Service Medal (1918). He was promoted to wing commander on 1 July 1929, and to group captain on 1 July 1935. Continuing to serve during the Second World War, he retired from the RAF on 30 July 1945. Insall's headstone is in Nocton Churchyard, Lincolnshire. His Victoria Cross is displayed at the Royal Air Force Museum in Hendon.

Footnotes

External links
Location of grave and VC medal (South Yorkshire)
G.S.M. Insall

1894 births
1972 deaths
Military personnel from Paris
British World War I recipients of the Victoria Cross
Royal Flying Corps recipients of the Victoria Cross
Recipients of the Military Cross
Royal Air Force officers
Royal Flying Corps officers
British Army personnel of World War I
Royal Air Force personnel of World War I
Aerial photographers
British Army recipients of the Victoria Cross
Escapees from German detention
British World War I prisoners of war
World War I prisoners of war held by Germany